(Main list of acronyms)


 z – (s) Zepto
 Z – (s) Zetta

ZA 
 za – (s) Zhuang languages (ISO 639-1 code)
 zA – (s) Zeptoampere
 ZA – (s) South Africa (ISO 3166 digram)
ZA  – Zambia (FIPS 10-4 country code) – Zettaampere
 ZAF – (s) South Africa (ISO 3166 trigram)
 ZAMS – (i) Zero age main sequence
 ZANU-PF – (i) Zimbabwe African National Union - Patriotic Front
 ZAR – (s) South African rand (ISO 4217 currency code)
ZAR – Zaire (ISO 3166 trigram, obsolete 1997)
 ZAS – (i/a) Zylinder Abschaltung System

ZB 
 ZBT – (i) Zero-Balance Transfer (accounting)

ZC 
 zC – (s) Zeptocoulomb
 ZC – (s) Zettacoulomb
 ZCM – (n) ZENworks Configuration Management
 ZCMK – (a) Zone Control Master Key
 ZCU – (i) Zimbabwe Cricket Union

ZF 
 zF – (s) Zeptofarad
 ZF – (s) Zettafarad

ZG 
 zg – (s) Zeptogram
 Zg – (s) Zettagram

ZH 
 zh – (s) Chinese language (ISO 639-1 code)
 zH – (s) Zeptohenry
 ZH – (s) Zettahenry
 zha – (s) Zhuang languages (ISO 639-2 code)
 zho – (s) Chinese language (ISO 639-2 code)

ZI 
 Zi – (s) Zebi
 ZI – (s) Zimbabwe (FIPS 10-4 country code)
 ZIF – (s) Zero Insertion Force (The device on a)
 ZIP – (a) Zone Improvement Plan code
 ZIRP – (a) Zero interest-rate policy

ZJ 
 zJ – (s) Zeptojoule
 ZJ – (s) Zettajoule

ZK 
 zK – (s) Zeptokelvin
 ZK – (s) Zettakelvin

ZL 
 zL – (s) Zeptolitre
 ZL – (s) Zettalitre

ZM 
 zm – (s) Zeptometre
 Zm – (s) Zettametre
 ZM – (s) Zambia (ISO 3166 digram)
 ZMB – (s) Zambia (ISO 3166 trigram)
 ZMK – (s) Zambian kwacha (ISO 4217 currency code)

ZN 
 zN – (s) Zeptonewton
 Zn – (s) Zinc
 ZN – (s) Zettanewton

ZO 
 ZOPFAN – (i) Zone of Peace, Freedom And Neutrality

ZR 
 Zr – (s) Zirconium
 ZR – (s) Zaire (ISO 3166 digram; obsolete 1997)

ZS 
 zs – (s) Zeptosecond
 Zs – (s) Zettasecond
 ZS – (s) Zettasiemens

ZT 
 zT – (s) Zeptotesla
 ZT – (s) Zettatesla

ZU 
 zu – (s) Zulu language (ISO 639-1 code)
 ZUG – (a) Z User Group
 ZUI – (a) Zooming User Interface ("zoo-wee")
 zul – (s) Zulu language (ISO 639-2 code)

ZV 
 zV – (s) Zeptovolt
 ZV – (s) Zettavolt

ZW 
 zW – (s) Zeptowatt
 ZW – (s) Zettawatt
ZW – Zimbabwe (ISO 3166 digram)
 ZWD – (s) Zimbabwe dollar (ISO 4217 currency code)
 ZWE – (s) Zimbabwe (ISO 3166 trigram)

ZZ 
 ZZZ – (p) to be tired (internet slang)

Acronyms Z